Cruel Intentions 3 is a 2004 American teen drama film directed by Scott Ziehl and released direct-to-video in 2004. Despite its name, the film has almost no relation to the previous films in the series, except for the shared themes and the lead character in this film, Cassidy Merteuil, who is a cousin of one of the characters from the first film, Kathryn Merteuil.

Plot
Cassidy Merteuil is a beautiful, manipulative student at an exclusive Santa Barbara college. Jason Argyle and Patrick Bates are roommates there.

They pull off a devious plan where Patrick beds Cassidy and disrupts a potential relationship she had been pursuing with a British prince. This then helps Jason win a bet he made with Cassidy (which turns out to have been Patrick's bet all along). When Patrick (who also reveals his awkwardness and social ineptitude to be an act) and Jason reveal their deception to her, she is devastated.

She later encourages them to compete against each other. Jason has to seduce Sheila, who is in a steady relationship with Michael, and Patrick has to seduce Alison, who is already engaged.

Jason succeeds in his part, but Patrick is rejected by Alison, who says she does not want to cheat, and does not find him sexually attractive. When classmate Brent Patterson shows an interest in Allison after being rejected by Cassidy, she succumbs to temptation and sleeps with him, not knowing Patrick is taking photos. Patrick blackmails Alison, using the photos of her cheating on her fiancé. He tells her how he succeeded before he throws her on her bed, pulls down her white thong and rapes her in order to fulfil his part of the bet.

Meanwhile, Jason and Cassidy strike up a relationship. As Patrick is left unsatisfied and angry by the rape, he attempts to seduce Cassidy, but she rejects him. So, he convinces Cassidy that the man she loves, Jason, is only staying with her because he wants to win the bet he and Patrick had made, which was to see who could sleep with Cassidy first.

Seemingly angry with Jason, she succumbs to Patrick, and Jason walks in on them. Patrick snidely remarks that both Jason and Cassidy have been victims of his cruel game to show them that they underestimated the evil in themselves. They ask him if he has ever been a victim, and he tells them no. Cassidy reveals that this had been her plan all along. She began the little charade so Patrick and Jason would seduce Alison and Sheila; before sleeping with Patrick, she took one of his sleeping pills, planning to tell the policemen that he had drugged and raped her.

As Patrick is led away by the police, bewildered and protesting his innocence, he is warned that another victim has come forward, and he will get the punishment he deserves for raping Alison. In the end, Jason and Cassidy are shown together, making another bet with each other, over the British prince from the opening of the film.

Cast
 Kerr Smith as Jason Argyle
 Kristina Anapau as Cassidy Merteuil
 Nathan Wetherington as Patrick Bates
 Melissa Yvonne Lewis as Alison Lebray
 Natalie Ramsey as Sheila Wright
 Tom Parker as Michael Cattrall
 Charlie Weber as Brent Patterson
 Michael Pemberton as Christopher Newborn
 Tara Carroll as Valeria Caldas

Reception
On Rotten Tomatoes the film has 2 reviews, 1 positive, 1 negative. Common Sense Media rated the film 1 out of 5 stars.

References

External links
 
 

2004 direct-to-video films
2004 films
2000s teen drama films
American direct-to-video films
American sequel films
American teen drama films
Direct-to-video drama films
Direct-to-video sequel films
Films about narcissism
Films produced by Neal H. Moritz
Films set in Santa Barbara, California
Films shot in Los Angeles
Works based on Les Liaisons dangereuses
Newmarket films
Original Film films
Films with screenplays by Rhett Reese
Sony Pictures direct-to-video films
2004 drama films
2000s English-language films
Films directed by Scott Ziehl
2000s American films